Florida Senate Bill 254 (SB 254) is a bill introduced into the Florida State Legislature in 2023. The bill would allow the state to take temporary custody of children who may be receiving gender-affirming care now or in the future. This bill affects transgender people and their families.

Proposed legislation 
SB 254 was filed on March 3, 2023 by Florida Senator Clay Yarborough and co-introduced by Senator Keith Perry. According to the bill, the state would be allowed to take children away from their families if the state believes that a child has been or may be experiencing gender-affirming care. In an initial draft of the bill, if the custodial parent receives gender-affirming care, then a child can also be seized from their family. This language has been removed from the proposed substitute bill. In addition, minors visiting Florida would be subject to the law, if it passes. 

In addition, health care providers would be required to say they do not provide gender-affirming treatment to minors or they could lose their license. The bill would also not target other types of minor care, such as nose jobs or breast augmentation. 

Yarborough considers his bill to be a "comprehensive package of parental empowerment and child safety legislation."

References

External links 
 SB 254

Florida law
2023 in LGBT history
Politics of Florida
LGBT history in Florida
LGBT rights in Florida
Discrimination against LGBT people in the United States
Discrimination against transgender people
Transgender law in the United States